Mytiloidea are a superfamily of small to large saltwater mussels, marine bivalve molluscs in the order Mytilida.

Mytiloidea contains two families, Mysideiellidae, which is known only from fossils and Mytilidae, which has living representatives.

References

Mytilida
Mollusc superfamilies